Max Lee (born January 9, 1988, in Hong Kong) is a professional squash player who represents Hong Kong. He reached a career-high world ranking of World No. 12 in December 2015. He helped Hong Kong to win the Asian Team Squash Championships against Pakistan in April 2018.

References

External links 
 
 

1988 births
Living people
Hong Kong male squash players
Asian Games medalists in squash
Asian Games silver medalists for Hong Kong
Asian Games bronze medalists for Hong Kong
Squash players at the 2010 Asian Games
Squash players at the 2014 Asian Games
Squash players at the 2018 Asian Games
Medalists at the 2010 Asian Games
Medalists at the 2014 Asian Games
Medalists at the 2018 Asian Games
Competitors at the 2009 World Games
Competitors at the 2017 World Games